Sardarpur Jhandir is a town in Mailsi, Vehari District, Punjab, Pakistan.

Sardarpur Jhandir is a town situated 9.5 km in North East of Gahi Mammar. Dunyapur is located to its west. Mailsi is located to the east, well-known for its cotton crops and siphon at Sutlej river. Sardarpur Jhandir is a town of Mailsi, having Masood Jhandir Research Library, the largest private library in Pakistan.

History
At the time of partition, this was agricultural land. The town features a library, which is the largest private library in the history of Pakistan. The Jhandir family has lived here for decades; they are primarily modern agricultural farmers. A few Rajput families also migrated and settled here. Some effective person of these families are Jhandir family.

Educational institutions 
Government high school for boys
Government high school for girls
Al-ghazali School

Business centre
It is entirely agricultural and has gained business popularity in a short time. Today it is one of the business platforms for businessmen and a mostly commercial area. The main source of its popularity is the production of agricultural products. This town is situated at the junction of Kahror Pakka and Mailsi. The town is located on roads which connect two cities and are used for the transportation of goods. It also connects four main cities: Kahror Pakka, Dunyapur, Mailsi and Dokota, making it the center of these cities.

Major finance services
 United Bank Limited
 MCB Bank

Government services
 Masood Jhandir Research Library
 Civil Veterinary Hospital, Sardarpur Jhandir
 Basic Health Unit, Sardarpur Jhandir

References

https://load.pk/muslim-commercial-bank/mcb-sardarpur-jhandir-branch-vehari

https://www.urdupoint.com/education/school/vehari/36185/gps-sardar-pur-jhandir.html

https://open.punjab.gov.pk/schools/home/school_visit_detail/1137600/list/

External links
 https://load.pk/muslim-commercial-bank/mcb-sardarpur-jhandir-branch-vehari
 https://www.urdupoint.com/education/school/vehari/36185/gps-sardar-pur-jhandir.html
 https://mapcarta.com/14697520
 https://open.punjab.gov.pk/schools/home/school_visit_detail/1137600/list/

Populated places in Vehari District